Carolina Rediviva is the main building of the Uppsala University Library in Uppsala, Sweden. The building was begun in 1820 and completed in 1841. The original architect was Carl Fredrik Sundvall. Later additions to the building have been designed by Axel Johan Anderberg and Peter Celsing. The name, literally "Carolina Revived", was given in remembrance of the old Academia Carolina building, which had functioned as the university library for most of the 18th century (see Uppsala University Library). Carolina Rediviva is the oldest and largest university library building in the country. It is also the site where the Codex Argenteus and the Cancionero de Upsala are kept.

Exhibition 

By the entrance hall of the library there is an exhibition hall where some of the most important objects in the library can be seen. Among the items are the Codex Argenteus, the map Carta marina, and a first edition of Isaac Newton's Philosophiae Naturalis Principia Mathematica.

Gallery

See also
Uppsala University Library

External links

Uppsala University Library, official site

Library buildings completed in 1841
Libraries established in 1841
Uppsala University
Academic libraries in Sweden
Buildings and structures in Uppsala
Terminating vistas
Museums in Uppsala